Hans Bosse (born 1938 in Wunstorf, Germany) is a German anthropologist, sociologist, and social psychologist. He is best known for his sociological and ethnological research on traditional societies of Papua New Guinea.

Bosse has made various contributions to sociology, including on ethnopsychoanalysis, the socialization of violence, criticism of cultural imperialism, and reciprocity in different cultures.

Early life and education
Hans Bosse was born in Wunstorf, near Hanover, in 1938.

From 1959 to 1965, he studied theology and philosophy at Wuppertal and Berlin, as well as at the University of Göttingen, University of Tübingen, and University of Heidelberg.

Bosse graduated from the University of Heidelberg in 1968 with a doctorate in theology, and received a doctorate in sociology from the Free University of Berlin in 1975. He obtained his Habilitation in sociology at the Free University of Berlin.

Career
Since 1976, Bosse has been Professor of Social Psychology and Sociology at Johann Wolfgang Goethe University in Frankfurt am Main, and was also a research group director at the Institute for Group Analysis (German: Institut für Gruppenanalyse) in Heidelberg.

Research
From 1978 to 1985, Bosse performed sociological fieldwork at schools in Northwest Province, Cameroon. During that period, he also did research in London, Heidelberg, and Melbourne as a visiting fellow.

Since 1984, Bosse has performed sociological research in Papua New Guinea for many decades, including an in-depth study on "becoming a Papua New Guinean" at Passam National High School in Paliama, East Sepik Province, Papua New Guinea. Georg R. Gfäller also performed research with Bosse in Cameroon and Papua New Guinea.

He has also done research on the concept of group analysis.

Bosse has made various contributions to sociology, including intercultural comparison on the socialization of violence in Africa and Papua New Guinea, and male willingness to use violence and its socialization in different cultures (see Freud's concept of sublimation); introduction of group analytical research into sociology; extension of ethnopsychoanalysis (see Paul Parin, known as the co-founder of ethnopsychoanalysis) to the study of ethnoanalysis; the connection between theology and sociology; criticism of cultural imperialism; and the reciprocity hypothesis, which states that societies are not only based on the exchange of goods or money, but also on prestige, reputation, art, objects of value, and so forth.

Personal life
Hans Bosse married Jennifer Rachel Bearlin in 1966 in Melbourne, Australia. Their first daughter, Alexia Renee, was born in Hanover, Germany in 1968, and their second daughter, Francisca Bronwyn, was born in 1970 in the same city.

Affiliations
 German Society for Sociology (Deutsche Gesellschaft für Soziologie)
 Association of German Scientists (Vereinigung Deutscher Wissenschaftler)
 German Working Group for Group Psychotherapy and Group Dynamics (Deutscher Arbeitskreis für Gruppenpsychotherapie und Gruppendynamik, or DAGG)

Selected publications
Some of Bosse's publications include:

Bosse, Hans; Hamburger, Franz (1973). Friedenspädagogik und Dritte Welt. Voraussetzungen einer Didaktik des Konflikts. Kohlhammer: Stuttgart, Berlin, Köln, Mainz.
Bosse, Hans (1979). Diebe, Lügner, Faulenzer. Von Abhängigkeit und Verweigerung in der dritten Welt. Frankfurt/Main: Syndikat.
Bosse, Hans (1994). Becoming a Papua New Guinean: A Report of a Sociologist's and Group Analyst's Research with Students At Passam National High School (NRI Discussion Paper, 78). National Research Institute. .
Bosse, Hans (1997). "Kontinuität und Wandel in Männlichkeitskonstruktionen: Ein Modell biographischer Sinnbildung mit Fallmaterial aus Papua-Neuguinea". In K.-S. Rehberg (Hrsg.), Differenz und Integration: die Zukunft moderner Gesellschaften; Verhandlungen des 28. Kongresses der Deutschen Gesellschaft für Soziologie im Oktober 1996 in Dresden; Band 2: Sektionen, Arbeitsgruppen, Foren, Fedor-Stepun-Tagung (S. 79–83). Opladen: Westdt. Verl. https://nbn-resolving.org/urn:nbn:de:0168-ssoar-139467
Bosse, Hans (2000). Männlichkeitsentwürfe: Wandlungen und Widerstände im Geschlechterverhältnis. Campus Verlag, 2000. 
Bosse, Hans; Vera King (2000) (eds.). Männlichkeitsentwürfe. Wandlungen und Widerstände im Geschlechterverhältnis. Frankfurt am Main: Campus.
Bosse, Hans (2010). Der fremde Mann: Angst und Verlangen: gruppenanalytische Untersuchungen in Papua-Neuguinea: Psyche und Gesellschaft. Psychosozial-Verlag. .
Bosse, Hans (1993). A Group's Bad Self in Papua New Guinea: A True Home in the Modern World? September 1, 1993 Research Article

References

See also
Vera King
Paul Parin
Georg R. Gfäller

Living people
1938 births
People from Wunstorf
German sociologists
German psychologists
German psychoanalysts
German anthropologists
German ethnologists
Group psychotherapists
Free University of Berlin alumni
Academic staff of Goethe University Frankfurt
20th-century psychologists